= Nahid Khazenie =

Mechanical engineer

Dr. Nahid Khazenie is a mechanical engineer who served as president of the IEEE Geoscience and Remote Sensing Society from 1998 to 1999.

Khazenie completed her undergraduate education at the Michigan Technological University before going on to receive several graduate degrees from the University of Texas at Austin, including a Ph.D. in 1987 for Mechanical Engineering and Operations Research. She joined the faculty and was a research scientist, specializing in remote sensing applications in agriculture and ocean studies. Because of her work there, she became a Senior Scientist appointment to the Naval Research Laboratory and then NASA as Earth Science Enterprise Education Programs Manager.
